Helga Rosa Maria Dudzinski (4 June 1929 – 28 October 2022) was a German figure skater. She is a three-time German national champion. A member of EV Füssen, she placed 12th at the 1952 Winter Olympics in Oslo, Norway. Dudzinki was born in Munich, the daughter of a Bavarian state official, and started skating at the age of eight.

Competitive highlights

References

External links
 

1929 births
2022 deaths
German female single skaters
Sportspeople from Munich
Helga
Figure skaters at the 1952 Winter Olympics
Olympic figure skaters of Germany